Montmagny is a commune in the Val-d'Oise department in Île-de-France in northern France.

Transport
The north of Montmagny is served by the Deuil - Montmagny station and the south by the Épinay–Villetaneuse station, both on the Transilien Paris-Nord suburban rail network.

Population

See also
Communes of the Val-d'Oise department

References

External links

Official website 

Association of Mayors of the Val d'Oise 

Communes of Val-d'Oise